Makarau is a surname. Notable people with the surname include:

 Ihar Makarau (born 1979), Belarusian judoka
 Raman Makarau, Belarusian Paralympic swimmer

See also
 Makara
 Makarau River, in New Zealand